

The governor of the North Central Province of Sri Lanka ( Uthuru Mæda palāth āndukāravarayā) is responsible for the management of the North Central Provincial Council. Some of the office's key functions include exercising powers vested in the governor by the Provincial Council Act No. 42 of 1987 amended by Act No. 28 of 1990 and the 13th Amendment to the Constitution. The current governor is Maheepala Herath.

Governors 
{{center|

See also 
 List of Chief Ministers of Sri Lanka

References

External links 
North Central Provincial Council

North Central